Karl Ivan Westman (August 5, 1889 – April 24, 1970) was a Swedish diplomat who served as Sweden's Ambassador to Switzerland in Bern between 1928 and 1938 and at the League of Nations, in connection with the Continuation War Sweden's ambassador to Helsinki March 1941 – October 1942, and after World War II Sweden's ambassador to Paris 1947–1956.

Westman had, as the highly intelligent man he was, done a fast career in Sweden's foreign ministry. His analyses of the host countries, and the power play at the League of Nations, were considered outstanding—a judgement that holds also in retrospect. The mission at the League of Nations was considered central to Sweden's foreign policy during the interbellum; and when appointed to Helsinki, that was at a moment when it was considered the most crucial of Sweden's embassies. For a diplomat, he was however also extraordinarily outspoken, often with a significant amount of sarcasm and unveiled criticism.

Karl Ivan Westman was the brother of Karl Gustaf Westman, Sweden's Justice Minister during World War II.

Finland and Operation Barbarossa
In his youth, Westman had been involved in the Nationalist Activism movement, which provided him both with relevant contacts and a good understanding for contemporary thinking in independent Finland. But he was also critical of its political development, from the bloody aftermath of the Civil War and forth, and particularly suspicious against the fennoman school of thoughts that dominated outside of the Finland-Swedish circles, and what he perceived as their strong anti-Nordic undercurrent.

His outspoken opposition against the host country's increasing cooperation with Nazi Germany, in the run up to and during the Continuation War, led to an unfortunate failure of his mission to Helsinki. His reports to Stockholm were factually correct, but he was unsuited to reestablish a Finnish feeling of trust for the Swedes after the trauma of the Winter War, and what in Finland was widely perceived as Sweden's betrayal; and in Helsinki the suspicion grew that his reports were in fact unfavorable. Most crucially, he never came on speaking terms with Finland's foreign minister Rolf Witting, despite their shared mother tongue. This contributed to the abortion of close intelligence cooperation between the two countries, and resulted among other things in a total failure for the Swedish attempts to improve the relations with the Third Reich be means of some kind of cooperation in Operation Barbarossa—executed as "support for Finland's heroic struggle against Bolshevism"—at the same time intending to ease Finland's emotional dependency on Germany.

Westman argued, not without some merit, that his views truly represented those of the Swedish government and civil service in general, and specifically the views of the cabinet. The realpolitik policies of Foreign Minister Günther were not as popular in the left-leaning majority of the Cabinet now, when a clash between Nazism and Communism was on the agenda, as it had been during the zenith of the Molotov–Ribbentrop Pact. What he said in Helsinki, he was convinced, was totally in accordance with the views of influential Social Democrats as Östen Undén and Ernst Wigforss, and also with the generally neutralist Liberals and Agrarians.

After Finland's re-conquest of Vyborg, that had been a Swedish–Finnish key castle 1293–1721, a general display of flags was proclaimed for August 30. In an unprecedented move, Sweden's embassy did not fly the flags, and soon Finland's Foreign Minister requested his removal. It would however last yet a year, and require the request of President Ryti, until Westman was recalled to Stockholm and replaced by a less controversial diplomat.

Westman felt the recall from Helsinki to be a humiliating reprimand, for which some kind of compensation was to be expected. When Westman's friend Östen Undén after the world war became Sweden's foreign minister, Westman was promptly given the prestigious position as State Secretary for Foreign Affairs, and soon one of the most prestigious embassies, that in Paris.

Awards and decorations
  Commander Grand Cross of the Order of the Polar Star (6 June 1936)
  King Gustaf V's Jubilee Commemorative Medal (1928)

References

1889 births
1970 deaths
Ambassadors of Sweden to France
Ambassadors of Sweden to Finland
Ambassadors of Sweden to Spain
Ambassadors of Sweden to Switzerland
Westman family
Commanders Grand Cross of the Order of the Polar Star